Snackmasters is a BAFTA-nominated British television programme, presented by Fred Sirieix and Jayde Adams, and produced by Optomen Television and Channel 4. The programme was broadcast on Channel 4 and streams on All 4.

The programme sees two professional chefs compete to recreate a brand-name snack or fast food item. The chefs present their replica snack to a panel of judges composed of workers involved with the manufacture of the snack, and the chef who is decided to have most faithfully recreated the snack wins the competition. During each episode, presenter Jayde Adams visits the factory that manufactures each snack, comparing how accurately the chefs are recreating the process.

Snackmasters was nominated for a BAFTA award in the Best Feature category at the 2020 British Academy Television Awards. 

An Australian adaptation of the show was first broadcast in November 2021 on the Nine Network. A New Zealand adaptation premiered on TVNZ 2 in April 2022.

Episodes

International versions

Australia

In September 2021, it was announced that Australia’s Nine Network had commissioned a local version of the series set to air in the fourth quarter of 2021, to be hosted by Scott Pickett and Poh Ling Yeow, with Yvie Jones as a co-presenter. The series premiered on 29 November 2021. A second season started airing from 4 December 2022, with the show shifting to a new knockout competition format.

New Zealand 
A New Zealand-produced version of Snackmasters premiered on TVNZ 2 on April 20, 2022, produced by South Pacific Pictures.

References

External links  
 Snackmasters at Channel 4
 

2010s British reality television series
2020s British reality television series
2019 British television series debuts
2021 British television series endings
2010s British cooking television series
2020s British cooking television series
Channel 4 reality television shows
Television series by All3Media
Television series by Optomen
Cooking competitions in the United Kingdom
Food reality television series